The statue of Sebastian de Aparicio is installed outside Puebla's Convent Church of San Francisco, in the Mexican state of Puebla.

External links
 

Outdoor sculptures in Puebla (city)
Sculptures of men in Mexico
Statues in Puebla